Coral Records was a subsidiary of Decca Records that was formed in 1949. Coral released music by Patsy Cline, Buddy Holly, the McGuire Sisters and Teresa Brewer.

Coral issued jazz and swing music in the 1940s, but after Bob Thiele became head of the label in 1954, he produced pop and rock musicians such as Buddy Holly, Jackie Wilson, Lawrence Welk, and Steve Lawrence and Eydie Gormé. He also produced hit songs by his wife, Teresa Brewer.

Coral stopped issuing new material in 1971. In 1973, MCA amalgamated Decca, Kapp Records, and Uni Records under the single MCA Records banner, and Coral was repositioned as a mid-line and budget album reissue label in the U.S. and internationally. That version of Coral (MCA Coral) lasted into the 1980s. Some product from MCA's former Vocalion Records budget label was manufactured with MCA Coral labels that bore Vocalion catalog numbers and was shipped in sleeves still bearing the Vocalion trademark, presumably to cut costs.

Roster

 Steve Allen
 Ames Brothers
 Louis Armstrong
 Two Ton Baker
 Kenny Bass and His Polka Poppers
 Milton Berle
 Owen Bradley
 Teresa Brewer
 Doug Bragg
 Paul Bruno
 Johnny Burnette Trio
 Champ Butler
 George Cates
 Patsy Cline
 Rosemary Clooney
 Al Cohn
 Dorothy Collins
 Don Cornell
 Eddie Costa
 Bob Crosby
 Jimmy Dorsey
 Pete Fountain
 Georgia Gibbs
 Charlie Gracie
 Lou Graham
 Buddy Greco
 Eddie Gronet and His Orchestra
 Greg Hatza
 Woody Herman
 Milt Herth
 Buddy Holly
 Will Holt
 Steve Lawrence
 Lennon Sisters
 Liberace
 McGuire Sisters
 Betty Madigan
 Barbara McNair
 The Modernaires
 Moon Mullican
 Debbie Reynolds
 Raymond Scott
 Jack Shook
 Frank Sorrell
 Gino Tonetti
 Tony and the Bandits
 Jackie Verdell
 The Vogues
 Romance Watson (of the Roberta Martin Singers)
 Lawrence Welk
 Paul Whiteman and his "New" Ambassador Orchestra
Lee Wiley
 Billy Williams

See also
 List of record labels

References

External links
 45 Discography for Coral Records 60000 series - 1949-1953
 45 Discography for Coral Records 61000 series - 1953-1958
 45 Discography for Coral Records 62000 series - 1958-1970
 45 Discography for Coral Records 64000 series - 1949-1955
 45 Discography for Coral Records 65000 series - 1949-1952
 Coral Records on the Internet Archive's Great 78 Project

American record labels
Decca Records
Jazz record labels
Record labels established in 1949
Record labels disestablished in 1973
Rock and roll record labels